William Brown may refer to:

Academics
William Brown (industrial relations expert) (1945–2019), British academic, Master of Darwin College, Cambridge
William Brown (plant pathologist) (1888–1975), British mycologist and plant pathologist
William Brown (psychologist) (1881–1952), British psychologist
William Fuller Brown Jr. (1904–1983), American physicist
W. G. Brown, Canadian mathematician
William Harvey Brown (1862–1913), American naturalist
William Jethro Brown (1868–1930), Australian jurist and professor of law
William L. Brown (geneticist) (1913–1991), American geneticist
W. Norman Brown (1892–1975), American Indologist and Sanskritist
William Yancey Brown (born 1948), American zoologist and attorney

Sportspeople

Association football
William Brown (footballer, born 1865), English footballer
William Brown (footballer, born 1874) (1874–1940), English footballer and cricketer
William Brown (footballer, born 1876), Scottish footballer
William Brown (footballer, born 1885), Scottish footballer
William Brown (footballer, born July 1885), Scottish footballer
William Brown (footballer, born 1889)), Scottish footballer
William Brown (footballer, born 1897), Scottish footballer
William Brown (footballer, born 1907) (1907–1976), English footballer and sprinter
William Brown (footballer, born 1928) (1928–2010), English footballer
William Brown (goalkeeper), English footballer
William Brown (Scottish footballer) (1912–2008), Scottish footballer

Cricket
William Brown (Tasmanian cricketer) (1807–1859), English-born Tasmanian first-class cricketer
William Brown (cricketer, born 1866), English cricketer
William Brown (cricketer, born 1876) (1876–1942), English first-class cricketer
William Brown (cricketer, born 1888) (1888–1964), English cricketer
William Brown (cricketer, born 1889), English cricketer
William Brown (cricketer, born 1900) (1900–1986), English cricketer
William Brown (New Zealand cricketer) (born 1917), New Zealand cricketer
William Brown (MCC cricketer), English first-class cricketer

Other sports
William Brown (ice hockey) (born 1998), see 1956 NCAA men's ice hockey tournament
William Brown (golfer) (born ), Scottish golfer
William Brown (baseball) (1866–1897), American Major League catcher
William Brown (tennis) (born 1945), American tennis player
William Brown (rugby league), Australian rugby league player
William Davie Brown (1852–1876), Scottish rugby union player
William Sorley Brown (1860–1901), Scottish rugby union player
Will Brown (racing driver) (born 1998), Australian racing driver
Rookie Brown (1925–1971), American professional basketball player
Bill Brown (runner) (1925–2018), American middle distance runner

Clergymen and theologians
William Laurence Brown (1755–1830), Scottish divine (theologian)
William Brown (clergyman) (1766–1835), Scottish clergyman and Hebraist
William Montgomery Brown (1855–1937), American Episcopalian bishop and Communist author
William P. Brown, American Presbyterian minister, author and biblical theologian
William Haig Brown (1823–1907), English cleric and headmaster of Charterhouse School
William Brown (priest) (1710–1797), Archdeacon of Northampton 
William Cabell Brown (1861–1927), American Episcopal missionary and bishop of Virginia
William A. Brown (bishop) (1878–1965), American who served as the fourth Bishop of Southern Virginia
William Adams Brown, American minister, professor and philanthropist
William Francis Brown (1862–1951), bishop, see Roman Catholic Archdiocese of Southwark

Engineers
William Liston Brown (1842–1929), American industrialist
William C. Brown (1916–1999), American electrical engineer
William F. Brown (engineer) (1919–2010), American welding engineer
William Brown (bridge designer) (1928–2005), English structural engineer, bridge designer
William Brown (mining engineer) (1717–1782), English mining engineer, waggonway designer and steam engine builder

Military people
William Brown (British Army officer) (1922–1984), commander of the Gilgit Scouts during the Partition of India
William Brown (soldier) (1759–1808), American Revolutionary War soldier
William Brown (Royal Navy officer) (1764–1814), British Royal Navy admiral
William Brown (admiral) (1777–1857), or Guillermo Brown, Irish-Argentine Navy admiral
William Brown (sailor) (birth name unknown), Black woman who briefly served in the Royal Navy in 1815, disguised as a man
William A. Brown (admiral) (born 1958), vice admiral in the United States Navy 
William H. Brown (Medal of Honor) (1836–1896), American Civil War sailor and Medal of Honor recipient
William Henry Brown (aviator) (1894–1969), Canadian World War I flying ace
William Maurice Brown (1910–1975), New Zealand Lt. Colonel; first principal of Faujdarhat Cadet College
William Gustavus Brown (1809–1883), commander of British troops in China and Hong Kong
William Perry Brown Jr. (1923–1952), American Marine and recipient of two Navy Crosses

Politicians and diplomats

Australia
William Brown (New South Wales politician) (1867–1954), member of the New South Wales Parliament
William Brown (Tasmanian politician) (1840–1926), Australian politician
William Villiers Brown (1843–1915), Queensland politician

United Kingdom
Sir William Brown, 1st Baronet, of Richmond Hill (1784–1864), British merchant and banker, MP for South Lancashire 1846–1859
William Brown (MP for Gloucester), in 1341, MP for Gloucester
William Brown (MP for Bedford), in 1397, MP for Bedford
W. J. Brown (trade unionist) (William John Brown, 1896–1960), MP for Rugby 1942–1950
William Robson Brown (1900–1975), UK Conservative politician, MP for Esher 1950–1970
Oliver Brown (Scottish activist) (William Oliver Brown, 1903–1976), Scottish nationalist activist
William Brown (Northern Ireland politician) (born 1930), Northern Irish unionist politician, MPA for South Down 1982–1986
Sir William Slater Brown (Lord Provost), Scottish businessman and Lord Provost of Edinburgh

United States
William Brown (congressman) (1779–1833), U.S. Representative from Kentucky, 1819–1821
William Brown (Illinois politician) (1819–1891), member of the Illinois House of Representatives
William Brown (Massachusetts judge) (1737–1802), Justice of the Massachusetts Superior Court of Judicature
William Anderson Brown (1861–1940), lawyer, member of the Minnesota legislature
William Denis Brown III (1931–2012), Louisiana state senator from 1968 to 1976
William E. Brown Jr. (1896–1970), mayor of Ann Arbor, 1945–1957
William G. Brown Sr. (1800–1884), U.S. Representative from Virginia and West Virginia
William Gay Brown Jr. (1856–1916), U.S. Representative from West Virginia, son of William G. Brown
William Wallace Brown (1836–1926), U.S. Representative from Pennsylvania
William Brown, mayor of Rockford, 1857–1858, see List of mayors of Rockford, Illinois
William Holmes Brown (1929–2001), Parliamentarian of the U.S. House of Representatives, 1974–1994
William J. Brown (Ohio politician) (1940–1999), Ohio Attorney General, elected 1970
William J. Brown (Indiana politician) (1805–1857), U.S. Representative from Indiana
W. K. Brown (1923–2011), member of the Louisiana House of Representatives for Grant Parish, 1960–72
William L. Brown (politician) (1840–1906), Ohio and New York politician
William Little Brown (1789–1830), justice of the Tennessee Supreme Court
William M. Brown (Pennsylvania politician) (1850–1915), U.S. Lieutenant Governor of Pennsylvania, electee to the U.S. House of Representatives
William W. Brown (Wisconsin politician) (died 1871), American politician
William Matt Brown (1815–1885), mayor of Nashville, Tennessee, 1865–1867
William Ripley Brown (1840–1916), U.S. Representative from Kansas
William Andreas Brown (born 1930), U.S. Ambassador to Israel, 1988–1992

Elsewhere
William Brown (British Columbia politician) (1838–1???), politician in British Columbia, Canada
William Brown (Manitoba politician), Canadian politician, 1922–1927
William Heartz Brown (1883–1967), Canadian politician in the Nova Scotia House of Assembly
William Brown (New Zealand politician) (1809–1898), member of first New Zealand Parliament

Writers
William Brown (journalist) (1737–1789), Canadian journalist and co-founder of the Quebec Gazette
William Hill Brown (1765–1793), American novelist
William Wells Brown (1814–1884), fugitive slave, African-American writer, and abolitionist
William Slater Brown (1896–1997), American novelist, biographer and translator
William F. Brown (writer) (1928–2019), American playwright
William Henry Brown (journalist) (1860s–1950), British co-operative movement journalist and activist

Other notable people
William Brown (physician) (1748–1792), American physician
William D. Brown (1813–1863), founder of Omaha, Nebraska
William Brown (miner) (died 1900), British trade union leader
William Penn Brown (1841–1929), American pioneer in the hobby of stamp collecting
William J. Brown (architect) (died 1970), American architect
William Kellock Brown (1856–1934), Scottish sculptor
William Lincoln Brown (1862–1940), second Register of Copyrights in the United States Copyright Office
William Robinson Brown (1875–1955), American horse breeder and director of the Brown Company
William B. Brown (1912–1985), American lawyer and judge in Hawaii and Ohio
William Theophilus Brown (1919–2012), American artist
William H. Brown III (born 1928), African American attorney, fourth Chairman of the Equal Employment Opportunity Commission
William Brown (tenor) (1938–2004), American opera singer
W. Earl Brown (born 1963), American character actor
William Mason Brown (1828–1898), American artist
William M. Brown (businessman) (born 1963), American businessman, CEO of Harris Corporation
William Brown (composer) (1790–1884), American composer and flutist
William Brown (headmaster) (1914–2005), British headmaster
William Alexander Brown, African-American playwright and theatrical producer
Sir William Richmond Brown, 2nd Baronet, English landowner
Sir William Brown (civil servant), English civil servant
William Charles Langdon Brown, British banker
William H. Brown (shipbuilder), American shipbuilder
Guillermo E. Brown (born 1976), American drummer and multi-disciplinary performer
William Roger Brown (1831–1902), British industrialist and philanthropist
William Brown, better known as Compa, British electronic musician

Other uses
William Brown,the main character in the Just William series
William Brown (ship), American ship which struck an iceberg and sank on April 19, 1841
William Brown Library and Museum, historic building in Liverpool, England
William Brown Street, Liverpool

See also
Bill Brown (disambiguation)
Billy Brown (disambiguation)
William Browne (disambiguation)
Will Brown (disambiguation)
Willie Brown (disambiguation)
William Broun (disambiguation)